Dastagir is neighbourhood in Gulberg Town, in Karachi, Sindh, Pakistan. It is mainly used to refer to Block 14 and 15 of Federal B Area, Karachi.

There are several ethnic groups in Dastagir including Muhajirs, Punjabis, Sindhis, Kashmiris, Seraikis, Pakhtuns, Balochis, Memons, Bohras and Ismailis.
There are many schools like "H.B MALI PUBLIC SCHOOL" , Study Collegiate and Speak and Spell.

See also
 Federal B. Area
 Gulberg Town

References

Neighbourhoods of Karachi